Harith ibn Abi Shamir Al-Gassani was the Ghassanid Arab Christian governor of Sham (Levant or Greater Syria) which was in the domain of the Byzantine Empire. He was a contemporary of Muhammad and King of Damascus now in modern-day Syria. He received a letter from Muhammad in which he was invited to Islam. Harith was a member of the Ghassanid dynasty, which ruled parts of Sham.

Letter sent by Muhammad
After the Hudaybiyah Treaty, Muhammad sent a letter to Harith Gassani which read as follows:

See also
Non-Muslims Interactants with Muslims During Muhammad's Era
Muqawqis

References

6th-century Arabs
7th-century Arabs
Syrian Christians
Ghassanids
Arab Christians